"Can't Cry Anymore" is a song by American singer-songwriter Sheryl Crow from her debut album, Tuesday Night Music Club (1993), released through A&M Records. Released in May 1995, the song reached number 36 on the US Billboard Hot 100, becoming Crow's third top-40 hit. In Canada, the song reached number three to become Crow's third consecutive top-three hit, following the number-one singles "All I Wanna Do" and "Strong Enough". Elsewhere, the song had limited success, reaching number 33 in the United Kingdom and number 41 in Australia.

Critical reception
Steve Baltin from Cash Box wrote, "Her remarkable streak should continue with this uptempo pop flavored tune. Slightly less rock oriented than "Leaving Las Vegas", her first single, this one seems to be a perfect fit for top 40, as well as CHR Modern Rock is a question mark, but top ten status for this kind of summer fun seems inevitable." Greg Kot of the Chicago Tribune said the song showed similarities to the Rolling Stones song "Honky Tonk Woman".

Track listings

 US 7-inch and cassette single
 "Can't Cry Anymore" (LP version) – 3:41
 "We Do What We Can" (LP version) – 5:38

 US and Australian CD single
 "Can't Cry Anymore" (LP version) – 3:41
 "No One Said It Would Be Easy" (live at the Empire, June 6, 1994) – 6:52
 "What I Can Do for You" (live at the Empire, June 6, 1994) – 7:17
 "I Shall Believe" (live at the Empire, June 6, 1994) – 7:31

 European CD single
 "Can't Cry Anymore" – 3:41
 "I Shall Believe" (live at the Empire, June 6, 1994)

 UK CD1 and cassette single
 "Can't Cry Anymore"
 "All I Wanna Do" (remix)
 "Strong Enough" (US radio version)
 "We Do What We Can"

 UK CD2
 "Can't Cry Anymore"
 "What I Can Do for You" (live at the Borderline)
 "No One Said It Would Be Easy" (live in Nashville)
 "I Shall Believe" (live at the Empire, June 6, 1994)

Charts

Weekly charts

Year-end charts

References

1993 songs
1995 singles
A&M Records singles
Sheryl Crow songs
Song recordings produced by Bill Bottrell
Songs written by Bill Bottrell
Songs written by Sheryl Crow